The Seattle Sounders were an American professional soccer team based in Seattle, Washington. Founded in 1974, the team belonged to the North American Soccer League where it played both indoor and outdoor soccer.  The team folded after the 1983 NASL outdoor season.

History

A Seattle expansion team for the North American Soccer League was proposed in early 1973 as part of a new Western Division that would include Los Angeles, San Jose, and Vancouver. On December 11, 1973, the league awarded an expansion team to Seattle that would be owned by a group of local businessmen led by Walter Daggatt of the Alpac Corporation; the team would play at Memorial Stadium in the Western Division alongside new teams in Los Angeles, San Francisco (later moved to San Jose), and Vancouver. A naming contest was held in January 1974, with a shortlist of six finalists: Cascades, Evergreens, Mariners, Schooners, Sockeyes, and Sounders. "Sounders" was announced as the winner of the contest on January 21, having been chosen in 32 percent of the 3,735 votes cast by the public.

The Sounders made their debut on May 5, 1974, against hosts Los Angeles Aztecs; the team lost 2–1. Their home debut, a week later at Memorial Stadium in Seattle, was a 4–0 victory against the Denver Dynamos in front of 12,132 spectators. The club played the first sporting event at the new Kingdome on April 9, 1976, hosting the New York Cosmos in an exhibition match that they lost 3–1 with 58,128 in attendance. The Sounders went on to play in two Soccer Bowls, losing in 1977 and 1982 to the Cosmos.

Frank and Vince Coluccio bought a majority stake in the Sounders franchise in 1979. The team folded on September 6, 1983, after the Coluccios struggled to keep the club afloat through the regular season; the team did not qualify for the playoffs. The Sounders lost an estimated $7 million in their final years of operation; the rights to the Sounders name were sold to former coach Alan Hinton. The NASL folded a year later and a new team, F.C. Seattle Storm, was formed to continue playing outdoor professional soccer in the city. The Storm later played in the American Professional Soccer League in 1990, but folded two years later. A new Sounders team formed in 1994 and played in the American Professional Soccer League (later the A-League and USL First Division). They were replaced by a Major League Soccer team, named Seattle Sounders FC in honor of both predecessors, which debuted on March 19, 2009.

Stadium
The Sounders played at Memorial Stadium for their first two seasons before moving to the Kingdome. On April 25, 1976, 58,218 watched the Seattle Sounders and the New York Cosmos in the first sports event held in the Kingdome.

From 1979 to 1982, they competed in three NASL Indoor campaigns, playing their home games also at the Kingdome.

Supporters
The Seattle Sounders were supported by the "Seattle Sounders Booster Club" in the 1970s and early 1980s.

Year-by-year

This is a complete list of seasons for the NASL club. For a season-by-season history including the current Seattle Sounders FC MLS franchise, see List of Seattle Sounders FC seasons.

1. Avg. attendance include statistics from league matches only.
2. Top goalscorer(s) includes all goals scored in League, League Cup, U.S. Open Cup, CONCACAF Champions League, FIFA Club World Cup, and other competitive continental matches.

Indoor

Honors

Team honors

NASL championships
 1977 runner-up
 1982 runner-up

NASL Conference championships
 1977 Pacific Conference

NASL Division championships
 1977 Western Division, Pacific Conference

NASL Division Titles (regular season)
 1980 Western Division, National Conference
 1982 Western Division

Trans-Atlantic Challenge Cup
1981 Winner

Europac Cup
1982 Winner

League MVP
 1980 Roger Davies
 1982 Peter Ward

Rookie of the Year
 1977 Jim McAlister

North American Player of the Year
 1980 Jack Brand
 1982 Mark Peterson

Coach of the Year
 1980 Alan Hinton

NASL Leading Goalkeeper
 1974 Barry Watling (GAA: 0.80)
 1976 Tony Chursky (GAA: 0.91, SO: 9)
 1980 Jack Brand (GAA: 0.91, SO: 15)

Individual honors

All-Star first team selections
 1974 Barry Watling, John Rowlands
 1975 Mike England, Arfon Griffiths
 1976 Mike England
 1977 Mike England
 1978 Mike England
 1980 Roger Davies, Bruce Rioch
 1982 Peter Ward

All-Star second team selections
 1974 Jimmy Gabriel, Hank Liotart
 1980 Jack Brand, Alan Hudson, John Ryan
 1981 Kevin Bond, Alan Hudson
 1982 Steve Daley, Ray Evans
 1983 Steve Daley, Ray Evans

All-Star honorable mentions
 1974 Roy Sinclair
 1975 Dave Gillett, Barry Watling
 1976 Dave Gillett, Jimmy Robertson
 1977 Tony Chursky, Jim McAlister, Jimmy Robertson
 1979 Alan Hudson
 1980 Tommy Hutchison, David Nish
 1983 Peter Ward

NASL Indoor All-Stars
 1980–81 Alan Hudson (All-West)
 1981–82 Alan Hudson (Pacific Conference)

U.S. Soccer Hall of Fame
 2006 Al Trost

Canadian Soccer Hall of Fame
 2003 Ian Bridge
 2004 Tony Chursky
 2008 Jack Brand
 2014 Chris Bennett

Coaches
  John Best 1974–1976
  Jimmy Gabriel 1977–1979
  Alan Hinton 1980–1982
  Laurie Calloway 1983

References

External links

Seattle Sounders All-Time Player Roster
GOALSeattle.com Sounders Online Museum

 
1974 establishments in Washington (state)
1983 disestablishments in Washington (state)
Association football clubs established in 1974
Association football clubs disestablished in 1983
Defunct indoor soccer clubs in the United States
Defunct soccer clubs in Washington (state)
North American Soccer League (1968–1984) teams